Tagum City National High School (TCNHS) (formerly Tagum Community High School), situated at Mangga District, Visayan Village, is the biggest of the five main public high schools in Tagum City and the only school orients Science based programs in Tagum City with matching programs of Arts, Sports, Journalism, Special Education and TechVoc with Special Class Program for Gifted and Talented Students, under the jurisdiction of the DepEd Division of Tagum City. Founded on February 14, 1967, the institution started from a Barrio Charter to host secondary education for students to a highly respected educational institution catering students from Tagum City and the province of Davao del Norte.

Being a research-oriented public high school, it is noted for its SSC (Special Science Curriculum) and Information Communications Technology (ICT) integration program. The school excels in many science and research-oriented competitions, both in and out of the division, as well as in other disciplines, including mathematics, communication arts (in Filipino and English), Humanities, social studies, Contemporary Arts, Health Optimization and Physical Education, Research, Entrepreneurship, Technical Drawing, and Special Program Curriculum such as Arts, Journalism, Sports, Home Economics, Industrial Arts, ICT and Agri-fishery Arts.

It is the home of the only Guyito sculpture in the region, handed over by Philippine Daily Inquirer on October 6, 2006.

History

Retired Schools Division Superintendent Eulalia B. Besañes, visiting and observing classes at Pantukan Provincial High School (Pantukan National High School) in 1967, spotted Gloria Gazmen. Gazmen was then a regional demonstration teacher and facilitator in English. Upon Basañes' encouraging her to transfer to Tagum Community High School, Gazmen left the established school to gamble her fate on then still shaky institution, taking a decrease in salary. She had no choice but to yield to the order of the boss whose vision was to established and strengthen a public secondary school in the province's capital town.

Harold Kenneth Curaje, then Assistant Schools Division Superintendent, informed Basilisa Zamora, Tagum District in-charge who was the first administrator supervising Tagum Community High School, about Gazmen's designation as school in-charge in 1970.

There was then a strong clamor to establish a public secondary school that would cater to the need of the poor and middle-class families who could not afford sending their students in the public schools. Former Magugpo Barangay Captain Curaje residence and members of the Barangay Council persistence fought for the approval of a Visayan Charter for the creation of a barangay high school despite conflicts and pressures. The Barrio Charter was approved on February 14, 1967, and Tagum Community High School was established. The school's formal opening was in June 1967 with 68 first year and 54 second year students. The first graduation rites were held in March 1970.

The first Parents and Teachers Association was organized by Narzal Conception. Harold Kenneth Curaje was elected president and Pelagia Conception secretary.

At the opening of the 1967–1968 school year, the pioneering teachers were Hermina Selga, Aida Jain-Alcid, Nazal Conception, and Silvestre Padilla. Part-time teachers were Evangeline dela Cruz and Miss Bagara. Some of the above-mentioned teachers were transferred, hence the appointment of Elizabeth Juarez, Irenea Jumat, Anecita Pondoc-Caral and Armanda Bermudez. The following year, Orlando Castronuevo and Betty Vinson were hired.

Seeing that the barangay had a difficulty in financing the school, the late Schools Division Superintendent Hermogenes Hipolito called a meeting with some PTA officials, former Mayor Herminigildo Baloyo, members of the barangay council and Gloria Gazmen née Tan. Magugpo Barangay Captain Dionisio Quirante, with his barangay council, Barangay Secretary Silvestre Padilla, and Barangay Treasurer Nicandro Suaybaguio, prepared a resolution to convert Tagum Community High School into Tagum Municipal High School. The Resolution of Acceptance by the Municipal Council was made by Municipal Secretary David Aguinaldo from the motion of former Vice-Mayor Gelacio Gementiza and duly seconded by Councilors Antonio Lagunzad and Lucio Rallos. In 1972, Tagum Community High School was converted to Tagum Municipal High School. The Municipal Council later approved the release of funds for the physical facilities for the construction of classrooms at the old Municipal Gym, where the Freedom Park is now located, for the occupancy of the increasing population.

In the 1976–1977 school year, PTA President Manuel Suaybaguio, Jr. and the rest of the officers with the assistance of Gazmen-Tan worked in the acquisition of a permanent school site since the school occupied a portion with Rizal Elementary School in the old Municipal Gym. Three members of the PTA Board of Directors who negotiated for the acquisition were Natividad Manzano, Sgt. Antonio Francisco Sr., and Sgt. Sergio Pendon Sr. Mr. and Mrs. Climaco Maurillo donated a 20,003 square meter lot to the municipal government during the administration of the former Mayor Gelacio Gementiza Sr. as the permanent site for the high school. On October 4, 1982, the present school site was finally occupied by Tagum Municipal High School.

Prior to the transfer of the site, Gazmen-Tan was swarmed with criticism by most parents, for the site was a haven of snakes, a swampy, flood-prone grassland adjacent to a rice field, and not an ideal place for a learning institution. Resisting pressure, she continued her desire to prove that their judgement was wrong.

In 1986, Superintendent Teofilo Gomez requested the municipal government to donate the site to the DECS. During the time of the Superintendent Prudencio Mabanglo and Mayor Victorio Suaybaguio Jr. the request was realized bearing land title number T-62535 approved on June 19, 1989.

TMHS was chosen as one of the two secondary schools in the Division of Davao of the Engineering and Science Education Project (ESEP) Education Institute of the Department of Science and Technology, because of its academic performance, thus the introduction of the Special Science Classes (SSC) and further improving the school's status as a science-oriented public high school.

The school boasted a cooperative GPTA and was a consistent recipient of assistance from national and local officials. This was mainly because of their trust and confidence in the leadership of Gazmen-Tan who steered the school through thick and thin, with the efficiency and competence of its faculty members who were employed after undergoing stiff selection process.

Since the school's foundation in 1967, many PTCA presidents have contributed in the modernization and progress of the school:

 Rosa Lucero (conversion of Tagum Community High School to Tagum Municipal High School)
 Manuel Suaybaguio Jr. (acquisition of the present school site)
 Former Barangay Captain Benigno Alvar (monetary assistance to teachers)
 Dr. Merolo Abrera (old fourth building)
 Norma Pereyras (front fence and gates, industrial fans, water system and sound system)
 Arthuro Bandong (completion of school fences)
 Engr. Gideon Ravara (electrical installations)
 Ruth Rala (construction of PTA office)
 Edgar Gante (completion of PTA office, Sci-Math Bazaar, School Clinic, Reading Center and sound system)

The conversion of the Tagum Municipal High School to Tagum National High School took place in June 1998 with the help of city officials and the present mayor.

Gloria Gazmen-Tan retired on January 4, 1999 and Head Teacher Rosalinda Fransisquete became OIC until September 1, 2000. Amadeo Patriarca then headed the school until his retirement on September 1, 2004, and was succeeded by Victoria P. Baquiedra, former member of the school's teaching force, founding Principal of the La Filipina National High School, Principal II of Jose Tuason Jr. National High School and Principal-OIC of then-Tagum National High School.

On February 14, 2006, on its 39th anniversary, under the leadership of Mayor Rey T. Uy and the Department of Education, Tagum National High School was converted into Tagum City National High School, becoming the premier secondary education institution in the province of Davao del Norte.

As of 2007 Tagum City National High School has become one of the tourist spots of Tagum City.

Balquiedra retired on May 9, 2009, after 65 years of service, most of it at Tagum City National High School as teacher, Principal-OIC and later, as Principal III for six years. She was succeeded by Virginia S. Maningo as Principal-OIC, who was succeeded by Teodorico S. Caballero, Principal IV from Tagum City National Comprehensive High School, on July 2, 2009.

The Department of Education – Division of Tagum City also announced during Caballero's appointment that the school, by 2010, could become the prime institution for secondary education not only in Tagum City or Davao del Norte but in the whole Region XI, with the support from the LGU and DepEd.

The strong support for the ICT integration program paid off in the 2010–2011 school year, when the school's website (hosted by Smart Communications) was named as "Smart Schools Program's Website of the Month – September 2010" due to the integration of many of the school's important services off- and online, the richness of content, navigation and the inclusion of forums solely created for the students and alumni, plus a "donation" button for the website's maintenance which can encourage help from visitors all over the globe, thus increasing the transparency and reliability of the school's services to its stakeholders and benefactors, notably the students, alumni and faculty.

Former names
 Tagum Community High School (1967–1981)
 Tagum Municipal High School (1981–1998)
 Tagum National High School (1998–2004)
 Tagum City National High School (2004–2020)
 Tagum City Science High School (2020)

Curricula
The school uses two curricula, the RBEC Curriculum (for RBEC students) and the SPSTEM (Special Program for Science, Technology, Engineering, and Math) Curriculum, both using the zero-based grading system for each period. In June 2010, the school shifted academic focus to the newly implemented 2010 Secondary Education Curriculum (2010 SEC), to be implemented in SY 2011–2012.

SPSTEM curriculum
Since STEM students are encouraged to proceed in engineering, scientific and mathematical courses in the college level as part of the mission of the Department of Science and Technology (DOST), the SPSTE curriculum is a science and math-inclined curriculum.

In tenth grade, students produce research papers and project proposals, and are encouraged to represent the school in division, regional and national science fairs, and then can proceed to compete in international science fairs.

Elective subjects are added to the students' load to emphasize science and mathematics, especially in the field of research and statistics.

RBEC and other curriculum

As of October 2012, this curriculum went obsolete for the next four school years, as the Grade 7 students were given a new curriculum in response to the K–12 program.

Student organizations

The student body is governed by the Supreme Student Government (SSG), with elected officials administering on a student-level system; elections are annually held before the current school year ends. The SSG is under the supervision of the school administration through an appointed SSG adviser.

Tagum City National High School has many clubs in support of its curriculum program, most notably the TCNHS Dance Theater Guild (DTG), Philippine Society of Youth Science Clubs in the Philippines (PSYSC-YISC), Visual Arts Guild (VAG), TCNHS Conexus Harmonia Chorale, TCNHS Rondalla, Press Corps, and the Boy Scouts of the Philippines and Girl Scouts of the Philippines – TCNHS Chapter.

All clubs are governed by officers, with each club president reporting to the SSG as a requirement. In turn, the SSG helps each club in their activities and school-wide efforts.

Student publications
The school's official publications are The Mover and Ang Galaw-Diwa. The paper is released once every school year, usually at the start of the second semester, when the National Schools Press Conference ends. Both publications are noted for their straightforward delivery of news articles and editorial columns, and have won many division, regional and national awards as one of the best school papers, notably in 1997 and 2003.

Tourism and events

TCNHS is now a tourist destination in Tagum City, especially for students from other cities and municipalities. The beautification of the school, which includes the construction of the new building, procurement of new facilities, and repair and maintenance, was under the initiative of the City Mayor Rey T. Uy and former Principal III Victoria P. Balquiedra.

Students from the Stella Mariz Academy of Davao City and North Davao College – Tagum have visited the school on educational trips.

In line with the improvement of school infrastructure and facilities, the school was the host of the 2008 Regional Schools Press Conference held in November 2008 and the 2009 Regional Communication Arts (ComArts) Festival held in January 2009. The school also hosted the 2010 National Schools Press Conference, and was the billeting center for Regions IV-A, IV-B, V and IX participants.

Gallery

Calendar
June – start of the school year
July – Nutrition Month
August – Buwan ng Wika (Filipino Language Month)
September – Science-Math Month, Communication Arts (English) Month
October – Values Education Month
February – School foundation/Valentine's Day
March – Graduation/recognition
April & May – CAT officer training, summer school program

References

External links

 Tagum City National High School official website (hosted by Smart Communications)
 Official website mirror (hosted by the school)

Educational institutions established in 1967
High schools in the Philippines
Buildings and structures in Tagum
Schools in Davao del Norte